Glycine latrobeana (clover glycine or Australian anchor plant) is a species of perennial herb endemic to south-eastern Australia. Its leaves are similar in appearance to the common pasture clover. It is native to Tasmania, Victoria, New South Wales and South Australia.

References

latrobeana
Flora of South Australia
Flora of New South Wales
Flora of Tasmania
Flora of Victoria (Australia)
Taxa named by George Bentham
Fabales of Australia